Dumke is a surname. Notable people with the surname include: 

Glenn Dumke (1917-1989), American historian
Klaus Dumke (born 1941), German fencer
Otto Dumke (1887-1912), German footballer
Ralph Dumke (1899-1964), American actor

See also
Dr. Ezekiel R. Dumke College of Health Professions, part of Weber State University